Babelomurex juliae is a species of sea snail, a marine gastropod mollusk, in the family Muricidae, the murex snails or rock snails. It occurs in the Atlantic Ocean.

References

juliae
Molluscs of the Atlantic Ocean
Gastropods described in 1939
Taxa named by William J. Clench